The 2016 Dartmouth Big Green football team represented Dartmouth College in the 2016 NCAA Division I FCS football season. The Big Green were led by head coach Buddy Teevens in his 12th straight year and 17th overall. The played their home games at Memorial Field. They were a member of the Ivy League. Dartmouth averaged 5,638 fans per game.

Schedule

Ranking movements

References

Dartmouth
Dartmouth Big Green football seasons
Dartmouth Big Green football